The Smagne is a  river in the Vendée département, western France. Its source is near Bourseguin, a hamlet in Bourneau. It flows generally west. It is a left tributary of the Lay into which it flows between Bessay and Mareuil-sur-Lay-Dissais.

Communes along its course
This list is ordered from source to mouth: 
Vendée: Bourneau, Saint-Cyr-des-Gâts, Marsais-Sainte-Radégonde, Saint-Martin-des-Fontaines, Saint-Laurent-de-la-Salle, Saint-Valérien, La Chapelle-Thémer, Thiré, Saint-Juire-Champgillon, Sainte-Hermine, Sainte-Pexine, Saint-Jean-de-Beugné, Bessay, Corpe, Mareuil-sur-Lay-Dissais

References

Rivers of France
Rivers of Vendée
Rivers of Pays de la Loire